New Dublin Voices, an award-winning chamber choir based in Dublin, Ireland, was founded by conductor Bernie Sherlock in October 2005. New Dublin Voices, whose concerts range in style and period from the medieval to the contemporary, takes special pleasure in exploring the music of living composers and has given many Irish premières, as well as numerous world premières of works by Irish composers. As well as giving concerts, New Dublin Voices is a regular participant in competitions, both internationally and at home in Ireland. The singers who make up New Dublin Voices come from many backgrounds, sharing in common high levels of experience and musicianship, a commitment to attracting new audiences, and above all a love of performing excellent choral music.

Festivals 
New Dublin Voices is regularly engaged to present concerts at prestigious international festivals at home and abroad. This has seen them tour extensively across Provence, Normandy, Burgundy and Catalonia in recent years. Highlights include: 

 England: 33rd Association of British Choral Directors Annual Convention, Leeds, 2018
 Spain: 11th World Symposium on Choral Music, Barcelona, 2017
 Spain: 8th Setmana Cantant (Singing Week), Tarragona, 2017
 Ireland: 63rd Cork International Choral Festival, 2017
 USA: 2nd World Choral Festival, Kansas City, 2016
 France: 23rd Festival des Chœurs Lauréats, Provence, 2015
 France: 6th Polyfollia – The World Showcase and Marketplace for Choral Singing, Normandy, 2014
 Switzerland: 9th European Festival of Youth Choirs, Basel, 2014
 France: Musique en Morvan, Burgundy, 2012

Awards 

 Wales: 2nd prize in the Mixed Choirs category, Gwobr Jayne Davies Prize for most outstanding conductor (Bernie Sherlock), at the Llangollen International Musical Eisteddfod, 2022 
 Northern Ireland: 1st prize in the International Competition at the 7th City of Derry International Choir Festival, 2019
 Germany: 3rd prize overall and the Pro Musica Viva - Maria Strecker-Daelen Prize to a conductor (Bernie Sherlock) for the best interpretation of a contemporary choral work (Ave Regina by Rudi Tas), at the 16th International Chamber Choir Competition Marktoberdorf, 2019
 Hungary: 1st prize in the Mixed Choirs category, Special Prize for best conductor (Bernie Sherlock), and the Special Prize for the best interpretation of a contemporary piece (Under-Song by Seán Doherty (composer)), at the 28th Béla Bartók International Choir Competition in Debrecen, 2018
 Latvia: Grand Prix at the 2nd International Baltic Sea Choir Competition in Jūrmala, 2017
 Finland: 2nd prize overall and the Special Prize for best interpretation of the set work (Mais je suis mort  by Riikka Talvitie), at the 5th International Harald Andersén Chamber Choir Competition in Helsinki, 2016
 France: Prix pour une œuvre de création (In te, Christe by Seán Doherty (composer)), at the 45th Florilège Vocal de Tours, 2016
 Ireland: 1st prize in the Fleischmann International Trophy Competition, 2nd prize in Ireland’s Choir of the Year, the Perpetual Trophy for the Performance of Irish Contemporary Choral Music, and the International Jury Award, at the 61st Cork International Choral Festival, 2015
 Slovenia: 3rd prize overall and the Special Prize for best interpretation of the set work, at the 13th International Choral Competition Gallus in Maribor, 2015
 England: Audience Prize at the 1st London International A Cappella Choir Competition, 2014
 Hungary: finalist in the 26th European Grand Prix for Choral Singing in Debrecen, 2014
 Northern Ireland: 2nd prize in the International Competition at the 1st City of Derry International Choir Festival, 2013
 Italy: Gran Premio Città di Arezzo and 1st prize in the Vocal Ensembles category, at the 61st Concorso Polifonico Internazionale "Guido d'Arezzo" in Arezzo, 2013
 Ireland: 2nd prize in the Fleischmann International Trophy Competition, 1st prize in Ireland’s Choir of the Year, and the Perpetual Trophy for the Performance of Irish Contemporary Choral Music, at the 59th Cork International Choral Festival, 2013
 Spain: 3rd prize in the Polyphony category at the 44th Tolosako Abesbatza Lehiaketa, 2012
 Belgium: Six prizes, including Choir of the Festival, at the 11th International Choir Contest of Flanders-Maasmechelen, 2011
 Italy: Three prizes, including 1st prize in the Renaissance competition, at the 58th Concorso Polifonico Internazionale "Guido d'Arezzo" in Arezzo, 2010
 Ireland: 2nd prize in the Fleischmann International Trophy Competition, the Schuman/Europe Award, and the International Jury Award, at the 56th Cork International Choral Festival, 2010
 Finland: 3rd prize overall and the Special Prize for best interpretation of the set work (Laudatio Domini by Joonas Kokkonen), at the 3rd International Harald Andersén Chamber Choir Competition in Helsinki, 2009
 Germany: 3rd prize overall at the 11th International Chamber Choir Competition Marktoberdorf, 2009
 Hungary: Grand Prix and the Interkultur Special Prize for best conductor (Bernie Sherlock) at the 12th Budapest International Choir Competition, 2009
 France: Prix pour une œuvre de création (Sea Swell by Enda Bates), at the 37th Florilège Vocal de Tours, 2008

Discography 
 Make We Merry, released 1 December 2017
 Music from Ireland, released 13 December 2014
 Christmas with New Dublin Voices, released 20 November 2010
 Something Beginning with B, released 24 September 2010

Other work 
As well as concerts and competitions, New Dublin Voices maintains a busy calendar of other activities including fund-raising – most recently charity concerts for Pakistan flood relief with Concern Worldwide, and for the PREDA Foundation which cares for neglected children in the Philippines

The choir makes occasional television appearances – notably appearing with The Priests in their debut Armagh concert broadcast nationwide in the US and Canada, and on RTÉ's Off the Rails, The Den, and others.

The choir works regularly with both the RTÉ National Symphony Orchestra and the RTÉ Concert Orchestra and performs at various special public events, including the official launch in October 2008 of the Irish Arts Council's first ever policy document for choral music, Raising Your Voice.

In 2016, Sony Classical released the original motion picture soundtrack for The Letters, a Hollywood feature film about the life of Mother Teresa of Calcutta. The album features New Dublin Voices and the Macedonian Radio Symphony Orchestra performing the film's original music composed by Ciarán Hope as well as Leona Lewis performing the song "Run" by Snow Patrol.

World premieres

 Skinny Dipping by Elaine Agnew
 The Island Itself by Sarah Quartel
 Rachel’s Lament by Ben Hanlon
 I Tell the Truth by Joan Szymko
 Waking by Tadeja Vulc
 as heather curves by Nicola LeFanu
 Winter in Inis Meáin by Linda Buckley
 I Wandered Lonely as a Cloud by Alex Ryan
 Solvere volo by Levente Gyöngyösi
 On Raglan Road arranged by Eoin Conway
 White Christmas arranged by Eoin Conway
 Home by Rudi Tas
 Nothing But Mud by Joan Szymko
 Time by Seán Doherty
 Prayer for those who shall return by Paweł Łukaszewski
 Comrades by Eoghan Desmond
 War - A Soldier’s Grave by Ēriks Ešenvalds
 Bean Pháidín arranged by Seán Doherty 
 We Three Kings arranged by Eoin Conway
 Luminous Star by Jonathan Nangle
 Little Girl Blue arranged by Seán Doherty
 The Stolen Child by Jaakko Mäntyjärvi
 The Second Coming by Alex Ryan
 Noel: Christmas Eve 1913 by Jaakko Mäntyjärvi
 Stille Nacht arranged by Eoin Conway
 The Christmas Song arranged by Eoin Conway
 The Darkest Midnight by Eoghan Desmond 
 Love Came Down at Christmas by Mark Armstrong 
 We are the Music-Makers by Colman Pearce 
 Psalmus by Péter Louis van Dijk 
 Snow Dance for the Dead by Seán Doherty
 Christmas Time is Here arranged by Eoin Conway
 Adam Lay yBounden by Eoghan Desmond
 There is no Rose by Eoghan Desmond
 Can it be True? by Seán Doherty
 Our Christmas Bells Ring by Mark Armstrong 
 The Same Stream of Life by Vytautas Miškinis
 Northwoods by Ola Gjeilo
 In te, Christe by Seán Doherty
 Down by the Salley Gardens arranged by Mark Armstrong
 O Holy Night arranged by Eoin Conway
 The Spire by Stephen Gardner 
 The Smock Race at Finglas by Stephen Gardner
 Aedh Wishes for the Cloths of Heaven by Eoghan Desmond
 Obsessive Choral Disorder by Daniel McDermott
 For the Love of Quiet Things by Jonathan Nangle
 Blackberry Picking by Éna Brennan 
 Sing No More by Hugh Martin Boyle
 Wave by Richard Gill
 Salve Regina by Ryan Molloy
 Dreams by Seán Doherty
 Would like to Meet by Peter Leavy
 On the Strand by David Collier
 Bubbles… by Donal Mac Erlaine
 Arrgh by Kian Geiselbrechtinger 
 To One Dead by Patrick Connolly
 Song for Billie Holiday by Anna Clifford
 Dancing on the Threshold by David Bremner
 All I Want for Christmas is You arranged by Eoin Conway
 Cantate Canticum Novum by Dan Forrest
 In the Bleak Midwinter by Alex Ryan
 The Wexford Carol arranged by Eoin Mulvany
 Mr. Blue Sky arranged by Eoin Mulvany
 God Rest You Merry, Gentlemen arranged by Eoin Conway
 Coventry Carol arranged by Jonathan Nangle
 The Savior must have been by Stephen Gardner
 Love is Stronger by Ben Hanlon
 Pauper's Lament/A Stealing Sadness by Enda Bates
 O frondens virga by Ben Hanlon
 Sea Swell by Enda Bates
 Bealach Conglais by Ian Wilson
 Curoo Curoo by Elaine Agnew
 Fall Approaches by Linda Buckley 
 Three Meditations for Twenty Voices by Daniel Jacobson
 Lux Aeterna by Ian McDonnell 
 Upon His Departure Hence by Michael Fleming
 ...[and] in the end, with so much swelling silence, why bother to make sounds at all? by Jonathan Nangle

Press Quotes
 "...a soft-textured beauty...New Dublin Voices has this in abundance." - Michael Dervan, The Irish Times
 "My first impulse after playing Make We Merry...was to play it all again. It has 18 tracks...and bubbles with energy and wit." - Richard Morrison, The Times (UK)
 "...the choral effect being simply breathtaking throughout in its refined beauty." - Dick O'Riordan, The Sunday Business Post

See also 
 Bernie Sherlock

References

External links 
 
 YouTube Page
 iTunes Store
 New Dublin Voices – About

Irish choirs
Musical groups established in 2005